The 2011–12 Biathlon World Cup – World Cup 5 is held in Nové Město, Czech Republic, from 11 January until 15 January 2012.

Schedule of events

Medal winners

Men

Women

Achievements

 Best performance for all time

 , 1st place in Individual
 , 51st place in Individual
 , 73rd place in Individual
 , 92nd place in Individual
 , 6th place in Sprint
 , 9th place in Sprint and 5th place in Pursuit
 , 15th place in Sprint
 , 22nd place in Sprint
 , 37th place in Sprint
 , 7th place in Pursuit
 , 6th place in Individual and Sprint
 , 20th place in Individual
 , 62nd place in Individual
 , 79th place in Individual and 56th in Sprint
 , 81st place in Individual
 , 88th place in Individual
 , 5th place in Sprint
 , 30th place in Sprint and 24th in Pursuit
 , 35th place in Sprint
 , 48th place in Sprint
 , 51st place in Sprint
 , 58th place in Sprint
 , 63rd place in Sprint
 , 75th place in Sprint
 , 6th place in Pursuit
 , 25th place in Pursuit

 First World Cup race

 , 64th place in Individual
 , 84th place in Sprint

References 

- World Cup 5, 2011-12 Biathlon World Cup
Biathlon World Cup - World Cup 5, 2011-12
January 2012 sports events in Europe
Biathlon competitions in the Czech Republic